Raffi Indjejikian is the Robert L. Dixon Collegiate Professor of Accounting at the Stephen M. Ross School of Business at the University of Michigan. His research is primarily focused on the development of models and theories illustrating the role of managerial accounting in decision-making through the basis of agency theory.

Educational and professional background
Indjejikian holds a Bachelor of Commerce and Diploma of Public Accountancy from McGill University in Montreal, an M.B.A. from the University of Western Ontario, and a Ph.D. from the Wharton School at the University of Pennsylvania. Before gaining a full professorship position at the University of Michigan in September 2000, Indjejikian held Associate Professor positions at the University of Michigan and University of Chicago from July 1992 to August 2000. He was also Assistant Professor, Instructor, and Lecturer at the University of Chicago, University of Pennsylvania, and McGill University, respectively.

Two-tiered financial reporting
Raffi Indjejikian's research on two-tiered financial reporting pertains to the differences between sophisticated and unsophisticated users. Unsophisticated users may lack knowledge and technology to be able to analyze such complicated financial statements and reports. Therefore, a competitive advantage is created for the sophisticated users while unsophisticated users are left with an “information overload”. Two-tiered reporting can be damaging to unsophisticated users specifically in situations where important information is being eliminated or when too much information is being extracted.

CEO & CFO compensation
Another focus of Indjejikian's research is the responsibilities and compensation of CEOs and CFOs of public and private corporations. Several of his papers have examined how firms design their bonus plans for the CFO and CEO and contrast those plans to decision making. The research of these papers was through surveys of members of the American Institute of CPA's. The main findings of these papers were that bonuses are based on the length of executive tenure, size of the firm, and length of the product development and life cycle. The papers also found public companies, relative to private companies have reduced the percentage of bonus based on financial reporting to the extent that the Sarbanes-Oxley Act has made firms much more concerned about the integrity of their financial reports and increased the costs of noncompliance.

Dynamic incentives and responsibility accounting
With Nanda, Indjejikian argues that incentive problems are a crucial aspect of responsibility accounting. Due to the Ratchet effect, the employer would be better off if both parties can agree on a multi-period contract without subsequent revisions. Two responsibility center structures are analyzed: Consolidated structures are produced when managers are attributed to multiple activities. These structures imply less ratcheting but at the loss of comparative performance information. Specialized structures mean managers are responsible for one activity thus providing a higher level of comparative performance information but also a higher level of ratcheting. Performance evaluation in firms with specialized structures is more informative because of the use of comparative measurements.

Research publications
 “Reply to Dynamic Incentives and Responsibility Accounting: A Comment” with Dhananjay Nanda, Journal of Accounting and Economics, August 2003.
 “Executive Target Bonuses and What They Imply About Performance Standards” with Dhananjay Nanda, The Accounting Review, October 2002.
“Private Pre-Decision Information, Performance Measure Congruity and the Value of Delegation,” with Robert Bushman and Mark Penno, Contemporary Accounting Research, 2000, Vol. 17 No. 4.
“Dynamic Incentives and Responsibility Accounting,” with Dhananjay Nanda, Journal of Accounting and Economics, April 1999.
“Discussion of: Optimal Contracting, Accounting Standards and Market Structures” Contemporary Accounting Research, Summer 1999.
“Performance Evaluation and Compensation Research: An Agency Perspective, ” Accounting Horizons, June 1999.
“Earnings Announcements and Market Depth,” with Robert Bushman, Sunil Dutta and John Hughes, Contemporary Accounting Research, Vol. 14 No. 1 (Spring 1997).
“A Model of Two-Tiered Financial Reporting,” with Robert Bushman and Frank Gigler, Journal of Accounting Research, Supplement 1996.
“CEO Compensation: The Role of Individual Performance Evaluation,” with Robert Bushman and Abbie Smith, Journal of Accounting and Economics, Vol. 21 April 1996.
“Aggregate Performance Measures in Business Unit Manager Compensation: The Role of Intra-firm Interdependencies,” with Robert Bushman and Abbie Smith, Journal of Accounting Research, Supplement 1995.
“Voluntary Disclosures & Trading Behavior of Corporate Insiders,” with Robert Bushman, Journal of Accounting Research, Vol. 33 No. 2 Autumn 1995.
“Accounting Income, Stock Price and Managerial Compensation,” with Robert Bushman, Journal of Accounting and Economics, Jan./Feb./March 1993.
“Stewardship Value of Distorted Accounting Disclosures,” with Robert Bushman, The Accounting Review, October 1993.
“The Impact of Costly Information Interpretation of Firm Disclosure Decisions,” Journal of Accounting Research, Autumn 1991.

References

External links 
 Faculty bio at University of Michigan
 http://en.scientificcommons.org/51312325
 http://www.bus.umich.edu/FacultyBios/CV/raffii.pdf

Living people
Ross School of Business faculty
McGill University Faculty of Management alumni
University of Western Ontario alumni
Wharton School of the University of Pennsylvania alumni
Year of birth missing (living people)